Victoria Brown may refer to:

 Victoria Brown (canoeist) (born 1950), British canoer
 Victoria Brown (water polo) (born 1985), Australian water polo player
 Vicki Brown (1940–1991), English singer